International Peace Supporting Standby Force or Onnuri Unit is a unit belonging to Republic of Korea Army Special Warfare Command, reorganized from preexisting ROKA Special Warfare Command 5th Special Forces brigade (a.k.a. Black Dragon unit), to ensure Republic of Korea's participation in international peace keeping operations. Deployed overseas, Onnuri Unit carries out UN Peace Keeping Operations (PKO) or multinational Peace Keeping Force (PKF) missions and instructs its troops in local languages and customs. Unit's name, 'On' means 'whole' and 'Nuri' means 'the world'. In other words, the name 'Onnuri' represents the unit that goes around the whole world performing its tasks.

The parent unit was 5th Special Forces brigade which was reorganized into Special Missions Group in June 2000 and was again into International Peace Supporting Standby Force in July 2010, becoming a current specialized unit for overseas deployment. During the 5th Special Forces brigade period and as of today the commanding officer is brigadier general, but it was colonel only during the Special Missions Group period.

See also 
 Republic of Korea Army Special Warfare Command

References

External links 
 네이버 지식백과

Overseas deployments of South Korea armed forces
Military history of South Korea
2010 establishments in South Korea